Da Tang Nü Xun An is a Chinese television series about Xie Yaohuan (谢瑶环), a fictional Tang dynasty female detective-official who solves several mysterious cases during the reign of the empress Wu Zetian. Directed by Tao Lingling, the series starred Gillian Chung, Benny Chan, Wan Ni'en, Lei Mu, Wu Jingjing, Wang Ji, Qian Yongchen, Kathy Yuen and Dong Qing in the lead roles. The series was first broadcast on Dragon Television on 7 July 2011 in mainland China.

Cast
 Gillian Chung as Xie Yaohuan
 Benny Chan as Lian Tingfei
 Wang Ji as Wu Zetian
 Wan Ni'en as Tang Min
 Lei Mu as Qin Ming
 Kathy Yuen as Zhu Yuexian
 Ye Zuxin as Ouyang Tianming
 Wu Jingjing as Caidie
 Qian Yongchen as Sha Hengtian
 Chen Ye as Yuguan / Yulang
 Don Li as Han Shi
 Huang Juan as Princess Taiping
 Dong Qing as Xiaofoye
 Ji Chenmu as Manager Liu
 Zhou Jingfeng as Hou Baobao
 Li Qingdai as Hu Guan

Broadcasts

Re-broadcasts

See also
 The Shadow of Empress Wu

External links
  Da Tang Nü Xun An on Sina.com

2011 Chinese television series debuts
Television series set in the Zhou dynasty (690–705)
Gong'an television series
Television series set in the 7th century